This list is of the Cultural Properties of Japan designated in the category of  for the Prefecture of Ōita.

National Cultural Properties
As of 1 July 2019, eight Important Cultural Properties have been designated, being of national significance.

See also
 Cultural Properties of Japan
 List of National Treasures of Japan (paintings)
 Japanese painting
 List of Historic Sites of Japan (Ōita)

References

External links
  Cultural Properties in Ōita Prefecture

Cultural Properties,Ōita
Cultural Properties,Paintings
Paintings,Ōita
Lists of paintings